Cardè is a comune (municipality) in the Province of Cuneo in the Italian region Piedmont, located about  southwest of Turin and about  north of Cuneo.

Cardè borders the following municipalities: Barge, Moretta, Revello, Saluzzo, and Villafranca Piemonte.

Demographic evolution

References

External links
 www.comune.carde.cn.it/

Cities and towns in Piedmont